A total lunar eclipse took place on Wednesday, December 19, 1945.

Visibility

Related lunar eclipses

Lunar year series

Saros series
It was part of Saros series 124.

Tritos 
 Preceded: Lunar eclipse of January 19, 1935
 Followed: Lunar eclipse of November 18, 1956

Tzolkinex 
 Preceded: Lunar eclipse of November 7, 1938
 Followed: Lunar eclipse of January 29, 1953

See also
List of lunar eclipses
List of 20th-century lunar eclipses

Notes

External links

1945-12
1945 in science